Simon Miller may refer to:
 Simon David Miller, British film writer, director, producer and investor
 Simon Miller (rugby union), South African rugby union player

See also
 Who Is Simon Miller?, a 2011 American spy family television film